Stacey Gartrell (born 6 January 1977) is a former freestyle long-distance swimmer from Australia, who competed at the 1996 Summer Olympics for her native country. She finished in eleventh position in the Women's 800m Freestyle, clocking 8:42.39 in the qualifying heats.

External links
 Australian Olympic Committee

References 

1977 births
Living people
Olympic swimmers of Australia
Swimmers at the 1996 Summer Olympics
Sportswomen from New South Wales
Swimmers at the 1994 Commonwealth Games
Commonwealth Games gold medallists for Australia
Swimmers from Sydney
Commonwealth Games medallists in swimming
Commonwealth Games silver medallists for Australia
Australian female freestyle swimmers
20th-century Australian women
Medallists at the 1994 Commonwealth Games